Dr. Eugene Revitch, M.D. (1909–1996) was born in Riga, Latvia, attended the University of Montpellier in France, and graduated from the University of Paris Medical School in 1936. He received his psychiatry and neurology training in the United States and served in the United States Army during World War II, evaluating and treating military prisoners at Fort Missoula, Montana. He became a captain in the United States Army Medical Corps.

During his 22-year affiliation with the New Jersey Diagnostic Center (the state's forensic facility), Revitch published some of the first papers on sexual aggression and sexual murder. He was a clinical professor of psychiatry at the Robert Wood Johnson Medical School and made a substantial impact not only on the lives of his students and his patients, but to the field of neuropsychiatry and forensic psychiatry.

References

1909 births
1996 deaths
University of Montpellier alumni
University of Paris alumni
University of Medicine and Dentistry of New Jersey faculty
Physicians from Riga
United States Army Medical Corps officers
American psychiatrists
Latvian emigrants to France
French emigrants to the United States